John R. Ellis is an American visual effects artist. He was nominated for an Academy Award in the category Best Visual Effects for the film Young Sherlock Holmes. In 1985 he won a Primetime Emmy Award in the category Outstanding Special Visual Effects for his work on The Ewok Adventure.

Selected filmography 
 Young Sherlock Holmes (1985; nominated with for as Oscar with Dennis Muren, Kit West and David W. Allen)

References

External links 

Living people
Place of birth missing (living people)
Year of birth missing (living people)
Visual effects artists
Visual effects supervisors
Primetime Emmy Award winners